Larry Donnell (born November 1, 1988) is a former American football tight end. He played college football for Grambling State. He was signed by the New York Giants as an undrafted free agent in 2012.

Early years
Donnell attended Carroll High School in Ozark, Alabama, where he played football, basketball, and baseball.

College career
Donnell played football for four seasons at Grambling State University. He switched from quarterback to tight end during his freshman year. He finished his college career with 38 receptions for 432 yards and 11 touchdowns.

After his senior season at Grambling State, Donnell was not invited to the NFL Scouting Combine.

Professional career

Pre-draft

New York Giants
Donnell, who was not drafted during the 2011 NFL Draft, sat out the 2011 season. He signed with the Giants as an undrafted free agent on March 13, 2012. He was waived by the Giants on August 31, 2012 and signed to the Giants practice squad on September 1, 2012.

He was signed to a reserve/future contract by the Giants on September 2, 2013. He played on special teams for the entire regular season and started one game as a tight end. He finished the season with 3 receptions for 31 yards.

On September 25, 2014, in a nationally televised game on Thursday Night Football, Donnell scored 3 touchdowns on 7 receptions for 54 yards. Donnell was the first Giant tight end to accomplish the feat of scoring three touchdowns in the same game since Joe Walton in 1962. Donnell ironically lost Fantasy football that week when he benched himself for Vernon Davis, who suffered a back injury after only eight yards in two receptions against the Philadelphia Eagles three days later.

On March 4, 2015, the Giants tendered Donnell, which yielded him the three-year veteran minimum salary of $585,000 over one-year. The next day, Donnell was aboard Delta Air Lines Flight 1086 when it crashed upon landing. Donnell was not among the injured or hospitalized passengers, and posted pictures and video he took of the incident to his Instagram account.

On October 11, 2015, Donnell caught a 12-yard game-winning touchdown pass from Eli Manning in a week 5 game against the San Francisco 49ers. On December 8, 2015, Donnell was placed on season-ending injured reserve due to a neck injury he suffered after trying to do a somersault over a defender on November 1 in a game against the New Orleans Saints. Prior to being placed on injured reserve, Donnell had missed the previous four games. Donnell became a restricted free-agent after the 2015 season. On March 3, 2016, the Giants tendered Donnell with the original-round tender of $1.671 million. On April 19, 2016, Donnell signed his one-year restricted free-agent tender after getting clearance from team doctors. On February 13, 2017 Mike Garafolo of NFL.com reported that Donnell would not be re-signed.

Baltimore Ravens
On July 30, 2017, Donnell signed with the Baltimore Ravens. On September 1, 2017, he was released by the Ravens during final roster cuts.

References

External links
 
 

1988 births
Living people
People from Ozark, Alabama
Players of American football from Alabama
African-American players of American football
American football tight ends
American football quarterbacks
Grambling State Tigers football players
New York Giants players
Baltimore Ravens players
21st-century African-American sportspeople
20th-century African-American people